The 1983 Copa de la Liga was the first edition of Copa de la Liga. The competition started on May 8, 1983 and concluded on June 29, 1983. Due to time constraints, saturation and club pressure, the Copa de la Liga only lasted four years since 1982, being cancelled in 1986.

Format
The Copa de la Liga was played by 18 teams of 1982–83 La Liga. All rounds are played over two legs. The team that has the higher aggregate score over the two legs progresses to the next round. The 1982–83 Copa del Rey semifinal losers are exempt until second round, and the 1982–83 Copa del Rey final teams are exempt until quarterfinals.

First round
First leg: 8 May 1983. Second leg: 21 and 22 May 1983.

|}

Second round
First leg: June 1, 1983. Second leg: June 8, 1983.

|}
Bye: UD Las Palmas.

Quarter-finals 
First leg: June 12, 1983. Second leg: June 15, 1983.

|}
Bye: Real Zaragoza.

Semi-finals
First leg: June 19, 1983. Second leg: June 22, 1983.

|}

Final

First leg

Second leg

References

Copa de la Liga
1982–83 in Spanish football cups